Elandré van der Bergh  (born 9 December 1966) is a South African former rugby union player.

Playing career
Van der Bergh was born in Pretoria and schooled in Port Elizabeth.

In 1994 he toured with the Springboks to Britain and Ireland. In addition to his one test match, he also played seven tour matches and scored 1 try for the Springboks.

Test history

See also
List of South Africa national rugby union players – Springbok no. 621

References

1966 births
Living people
South African rugby union players
South Africa international rugby union players
Eastern Province Elephants players
Rugby union players from Pretoria
Rugby union locks
Rugby union flankers